Paul Daniel Moga (born November 13, 1972) is a United States Air Force brigadier general who has been serving as the Commandant of Cadets of the United States Air Force Academy since May 2021. Previously, he was the Deputy Director for Operations of the United States Northern Command.

Moga was also the host of American Heroes Channel (formerly named the Military Channel) Television shows Showdown: Air Combat and Great Planes.

Early life 

Paul Moga was born in Saint Paul, Minnesota, on November 13, 1972, and lived in the Saint Paul suburb of North Oaks, Minnesota. He attended Cretin-Derham Hall High School, graduating in May 1991. After high school, Moga attended the United States Air Force Academy and graduated with the Class of 1995.

Military career 

After graduating from the Air Force Academy, Paul Moga remained at the Academy on casual status until he attended Joint Specialized Undergraduate Pilot Training at Laughlin Air Force Base, Texas. He graduated as the Distinguished Graduate, Academic Award, Flying Award and AETC Commander's Trophy recipient. Moga then attended Introduction to Fighter Fundamentals at Columbus Air Force Base, Mississippi, and F-15 Eagle Formal Training Unit (FTU) at Tyndall Air Force Base, Florida Upon graduation, he was then assigned to Elmendorf Air Force Base, Alaska, for three years. Following that assignment, Moga moved back to Tyndall Air Force base to serve as an F-15C FTU Instructor Pilot where he taught for four years. During that time, he attended Squadron Officer School at Maxwell Air Force Base, Alabama, and received Distinguished Graduate honors.

Moga was one of thirteen pilots Air Force-wide accepted into the F-22A Raptor program as initial FTU IP cadre in the 43rd Fighter Squadron at Tyndall AFB. He was the 43rd Fighter Squadron Flight Commander of the year in 2005 and the 325th Fighter Wing Lance P. Sijan Award nominee for 2006. In February 2006 he was selected to be the first F-22 Demonstration Pilot and moved to Langley Air Force Base in August of that year.

Between May 2011 and June 2012, Moga was an F-22 Evaluator and Commander of the 525th Fighter Squadron flying out of Joint Base Elmendorf-Richardson, Alaska. Between June 2012 and February 2013, he was a student at the NATO Defense College in Rome, Italy. After graduating from the NATO defense college, he became the Executive Officer to the Chief of Staff of the U.S. European Command, in Stuttgart, Germany until June 2015 when he was assigned as the Vice Commander of the 80th Flying Training Wing. Moga would serve as a vice wing commander until April 2017 when he became the commander of the 33rd Fighter Wing. Moga commanded the 33rd Fighter Wing for over two years between April 2017 and June 2019. In June 2019, then Colonel Moga became the Strategic Planning and Integration Division Chief, for Headquarters U.S. Air Force A8, at the Pentagon. Moga eventually became the Deputy Director for Operations of the United States Northern Command after 13 months at the pentagon in July 2020. Moga has over 2,600 flying hours in fighter aircraft and over 250 combat hours over Yugoslavia and Iraq.

Awards and decorations

Effective dates of promotion

References

External links
 

Living people
People from Saint Paul, Minnesota
Military personnel from Minnesota
United States Air Force generals
United States Air Force Academy alumni
1972 births